Ben Nicholas is an Australian actor, known for playing Scott "Stingray" Timmins in the Australian soap opera Neighbours.

Early and personal life
Raised in Adelaide, South Australia, Nicholas lives in Melbourne, Australia.

Nicholas is married to Stephanie Lilja. Their first child was born on 23 June 2022.

Career
Nicholas played the character of Stingray Timmins on the Australian soap opera Neighbours. His final performance as Stingray aired on 23 March 2007. Nicholas travelled from Australia to the UK to perform pantomimes over the Christmas period. In December 2006, he performed at the Marlowe Theatre, in Canterbury, Kent, as Jack in Jack and the Beanstalk. He performed in Cinderella in the Gordon Craig Theatre in Stevenage from 1 December 2007 until 27 January 2008. He appeared in Jack and the Beanstalk once more, playing the titular role of Jack, at the Gordon Craig Theatre in Stevenage from 29 November 2008 until 25 January 2009. He was also involved with The Rayz, a London-based band which toured during September–October 2007, playing over 40 dates.

Nicholas appeared on BBC's Celebrity Scissorhands for Children in Need 2007.

Nicholas appeared in the stage version of the Disney film High School Musical in London, playing the part of Jack Scott. The shows ran from Saturday 28 June 2008 until Sunday 31 August 2008 in the Hammersmith Apollo London. After moving back to Australia, he played Pepper in the Australian Tour of Mamma Mia!

In 2015, Nicholas created, wrote and starred in the spoof game show series Footballer Wants A Wife, which was funded by Screen Australia. He played the lead role of Steven Papakonstantinou.

Filmography
1999 Chuck Finn – Episode: "Chuck Who" as Sam
2004 Good Morning Australia as himself (9 February 2004)
2004–2007 Neighbours as Scott Stingray Timmins
2005 Scooter: Secret Agent – Episode: "Operation: Mask-In-A-Can" as Vern
2013 Cheerleader Diaries
2014 Neighbours VS Zombies
2015 Footballer Wants A Wife
2015 Waste of Time

Theatre
1999  Les Misérables – Sam
2000  The Boy From Oz – Young Peter Allan
2001  The Sound of Music – Kurt von Trapp
2002  Singin' in the Rain – Young Cosmo & Don
2002  Oliver! – The Artful Dodger (Melbourne)
2004  Neighbours Rocky Horror Show, (Melbourne)
2005  A Bunch of Ratbags (Theatreworks, (Melbourne)
2005  9 to 5 (The Dragonfly Theatre & Cabaret Restaurant, Melbourne)
2006–2007  Jack and the Beanstalk as Jack Trott (Marlowe Theatre, Canterbury, England)
2007 Oliver! – The Artful Dodger (Central Theatre, Chatham, England)
2007–2008 Cinderella as 'Buttons' (Gordon Craig Theatre, Stevenage, England)
2008  High School Musical: Live on stage as Jack Scott
2008–2009 Jack and the Beanstalk as Jack Trott (Gordon Craig Theatre, Stevenage, England)
2010 Mamma Mia! as Pepper ((Australia))

Awards
2005 Logie Awards Winner as part of the induction of Neighbours into the Logies Hall of Fame
2005 Logie Awards Nomination for 'Most Popular New Talent (male)
2006 Ellerton Awards Winner of 'Best stage dancer with Chris Heyes (male)

References

External links

1987 births
Living people
Australian male soap opera actors
Australian male musical theatre actors